In nuclear physics, the Bateman equation is a mathematical model describing abundances and activities in a decay chain as a function of time, based on the decay rates and initial abundances. The model was formulated by Ernest Rutherford in 1905 and the analytical solution was provided by Harry Bateman in 1910.

If, at time t, there are  atoms of isotope  that decays into isotope  at the rate , the amounts of isotopes in the k-step decay chain evolves as:

 

(this can be adapted to handle decay branches). While this can be solved explicitly for i = 2, the formulas quickly become cumbersome for longer chains. The Bateman equation is a classical master equation where the transition rates are only allowed from one species (i) to the next (i+1) but never in the reverse sense (i+1 to i is forbidden).

Bateman found a general explicit formula for the amounts by taking the Laplace transform of the variables.

(it can also be expanded with source terms, if more atoms of isotope i are provided externally at a constant rate).

While the Bateman formula can be implemented in a computer code, if  for some isotope pair, cancellation can lead to computational errors. Therefore, other methods such as numerical integration or the matrix exponential method are also in use.

For example, for the simple case of a chain of three isotopes the corresponding Bateman equation reduces to

 

Which gives the following formula for activity of isotope  (by substituting )

See also
 Harry Bateman
 List of equations in nuclear and particle physics
 Transient equilibrium
 Secular equilibrium
 Pharmacokinetics, loose applicability

References

Nuclear history of the United Kingdom
Ordinary differential equations
Radioactivity